Brandon Lamon Jones (born December 10, 1983) is an American former professional baseball outfielder. He played in Major League Baseball for the Atlanta Braves from 2007 to 2009. Listed at 6-foot-2 and 195 pounds, Jones bats left-handed and throws right-handed.

Career

Atlanta Braves
Jones was drafted by the Atlanta Braves in the 24th round of the 2003 Major League Baseball Draft out of Wewahitchka High School in Wewahitchka, Florida. Entering 2007, he was rated by Baseball America as the number four prospect in the Braves organization. Days after leading the Triple-A Richmond Braves to the 2007 Governors' Cup championship in the International League, Jones made his big league debut on September 16, 2007, going hitless in four at bats. On September 17, Jones collected his first major league RBI. He got his first career base hit on September 28, a double, against the Houston Astros. He returned to Richmond to play in the Triple-A Championship Game, getting one hit in a losing effort. On June 11, 2008, he was recalled by the Braves from Richmond. Jones hit his first major league home run off Los Angeles Angels of Anaheim starter Ervin Santana on June 14. The Braves designated Jones for assignment on January 12, 2010, to open up a roster spot for Eric Hinske.

Pittsburgh Pirates
On January 19, he was claimed by the Pittsburgh Pirates.

Detroit Tigers
On August 2, 2010, Jones was traded by the Pirates to the Detroit Tigers for a player to be named later. He was assigned to the Double-A Erie SeaWolves.

Milwaukee Brewers
On January 4, 2011, Jones signed a minor league contract with the Milwaukee Brewers. He played 68 games for the Double-A Huntsville Stars before being released.

Independent Leagues
Jones finished the 2011 season with the Lancaster Barnstormers. He started the 2012 season with the Kansas City T-Bones of the American Association. Jones played for Kansas City in the 2013 season as well.

Jones signed with the Sioux Falls Canaries of the American Association for the 2014 season.

Jones signed with the York Revolution for the 2015 season. Jones was later traded to the Lancaster Barnstormers, his second time with Lancaster. Jones was later traded to the Bridgeport Bluefish. He retired on August 6, 2015.

References

External links

1983 births
Living people
African-American baseball players
Major League Baseball left fielders
Baseball players from Florida
People from Panama City, Florida
Atlanta Braves players
Mayos de Navojoa players
Danville Braves players
Rome Braves players
Gulf Coast Braves players
Myrtle Beach Pelicans players
Tallahassee Eagles baseball players
Mississippi Braves players
Richmond Braves players
Gwinnett Braves players
Indianapolis Indians players
Altoona Curve players
Erie SeaWolves players
Huntsville Stars players
Lancaster Barnstormers players
Kansas City T-Bones players
New Jersey Jackals players
Sioux Falls Canaries players
York Revolution players
People from Wewahitchka, Florida
American expatriate baseball players in Mexico
21st-century African-American sportspeople
20th-century African-American people